The 2011 Southern Indoor Football League season was the SIFL's third overall season, the first since its merger with the American Indoor Football Association (AIFA), and the last before its breakup into three regional leagues.

Final regular season standings

 Green indicates clinched playoff berth
 Purple indicates division champion
 Grey indicates best league record
 * = Failed to make the playoffs despite winning division
 ** = Folded five games into their season.
 *** = Suspended operations prior to the season due to lack of Worker's Compensation Insurance

Playoffs

SIFL Championship: Located at the Albany Civic Center in Albany, Georgia on Saturday, July 2

References

2011 Southern Indoor Football League season